Woodlawn is a light rail station in Charlotte, North Carolina. The at-grade dual side platforms are a stop along the Lynx Blue Line and serves an area of mostly commercial and industrial businesses, with the neighborhoods of Collingwood and Madison Park located nearby.  It also features a 382-space park and ride and local bus connections.

Location 
Next to the station are two small strip malls: Time Square Station and Woodlawn Plaza. Woodlawn Marketplace, a much larger strip mall that include Burlington, Home Depot, and TJ Maxx, is adjacent to the station, but can only be accessed via Woodlawn Road.

History
The station was part of the overall planning and construction of the LYNX Blue Line; starting in 1999, it was approved in February 2000 and construction began on February 26, 2005.

The station officially opened for service on Saturday, November 24, 2007, and as part of its opening celebration fares were not collected. Regular service with fare collection began on Monday, November 26, 2007. By 2017, the side platforms were lengthened to allow three-car trains at the station.

Station layout 
The station consists of two side platforms and six covered waiting areas; other amenities include ticket vending machines, emergency call box, and bicycle racks. The station also features several art installations including a drinking fountain basin designed to look like dogwood, the North Carolina state flower, by Nancy Blum. Bas-reliefs entitled Hornbeam, by Alice Adams. Leaf motifs on both the pavers and shelters, by Leticia Huerta. River stone benches, by Hoss Haley, and track fencing with white oak leaves, by Shaun Cassidy.

Adjacent to the station is the park and ride, which features a 382-space surface parking lot and three bus bays. Separate entrance and exit are both located on Old Pineville Road; parking is free for patrons for either bus or light rail and is limited to 24 hours.

References

External links
 
 Woodlawn Station

Woodlawn
Railway stations in the United States opened in 2007
2007 establishments in North Carolina